Buffalo is the four-track eponymous extended play by Australian rock band, Buffalo, originally released in 1974 on the Vertigo label. The line-up for the EP was Paul Balbi on drums, John Baxter on lead guitar, Jimmy Economou on drums, Alan Milano on vocals, Dave Tice on lead vocals, and Peter Wells on bass guitar. It compiled tracks from previous singles by the band. The EP has never been reissued after its original pressing, and is now considered a rare collectable. However, tracks from the EP appeared on remastered and reissued versions of Buffalo's studio albums, Dead Forever... and Volcanic Rock, via the Aztec Music label.

Reception 

Buffalos tracks were re-visited by LouderSounds Geoff Barton when reviewing their career. "Suzie Sunshine" and "Dead Forever", showed Buffalo's "primordial potency still shines through. 'Suzie Sunshine',... and the title track have hooks so sharp they could snare a shiver of tiger sharks," "Sunrise Come My Way", "balances Tice’s gnawing holler with Baxter’s six-string savagery, all wrapped up in a pro-environment/anti-war message."

Track listing

Buffalo (1974) – Phonogram/Vertigo 
 "Suzie Sunshine" (Peter Brett, John Alan Baxter) – 2:56
 "Dead Forever" (Dave Tice, Baxter) – 5:32
 "Barbershop Rock" (Baxter) – 3:24
 "Sunrise Come My Way" (Tice, Baxter)  – 3:44

Personnel 

 Paul Balbi – drums
 John Baxter – lead guitar
 Jimmy Economou – drums
 Alan Milano – vocals
 Dave Tice – lead vocals
 Peter Wells – bass guitar

References 

Buffalo (band) albums
1974 EPs